Marzhangulovo (Märyämğol) is a rural locality (a village) in Ariyevsky Selsoviet, Duvansky District, Bashkortostan, Russia. The population was 231 as of 2010. There is 1 street.

Geography 
Marzhangulovo is located 13 km north of Mesyagutovo (the district's administrative centre) by road. Ariyevo is the nearest rural locality.

References 

Rural localities in Duvansky District